Tamalous is a town and commune in Skikda Province in north-eastern Algeria. According to the 2008 census it has a population of 23,728.

Geography

Climate
The climate is warm and temperate in Tamalous. There is more rainfall in the winter than in the summer. The Köppen-Geiger climate classification is Csa.

Demographics

References

Communes of Skikda Province
Algeria
Cities in Algeria